How Videogames Changed the World is a one-off television special by Charlie Brooker which was aired on Channel 4 in November 2013. The show examines the 25 most significant video games according to Brooker, and through that, covers the history of the medium and its impact on wider culture.

Pundits featured 
 Jonathan Ross                                                              
 Jeff Minter
 Keith Stuart
 Peter Serafinowicz
 Tom Watson (Labour politician)
 Peter Molyneux
 Aoife Wilson (writer for Official Xbox Magazine)
 Rob Florence
 Kate Russell (reporter)
 Graham Linehan
 Dara Ó Briain
 Gary Whitta
 David Braben
 Ellie Gibson (journalist for Eurogamer)
 Labrinth
 Felicia Day
 Keza MacDonald
 Pete Donaldson
 Berni Goode (cyber-psychologist)
 Tim Schafer
 Neil Druckmann
 Ron Gilbert
 Susan Calman (comedian)
 John Romero
 Rhianna Pratchett
 Matt Lees
 Quintin Smith (then-journalist for Eurogamer)
 Will Wright (game designer)
 Malorie Blackman
 Nolan Bushnell
 Vince Zampella
Pundits Aoife Wilson, Keza MacDonald, Quintin Smith and show writer Jon Blythe would later make several appearances on the podcast Daft Souls hosted by show writer and pundit Matt Lees.

List of games

Reception
Dan Whitehead, in a review for Eurogamer, found the selection of games well chosen, enabling the show to cover the history of video games as fully as possible given its runtime.  He also praised the choice of pundits, highlighting that even the most recognisable of names, such as Jonathan Ross and Peter Serafinowicz, were included because they had a clear love of games and not for their celebrity appeal. Whitehead concluded that the show was a success, fun and informative, but also hampered by the format - having to cover the entirety of video gaming history in one show to an unfamiliar audience, a symptom of the lack of video games representation on television.

Keith Stuart, who appeared on the show, reflected on its merits in a column for The Guardian.  Stuart described how ending the show with Twitter was a clever way of showing how gamification has infiltrated everyday lives, with social networks relying on the same reward systems as video games.  Stuart liked how the show featured games like Papers, Please, a game that explores guilt and the nature of evil, which helped to remove misconceptions that video games are incapable of exploring real-world issues.  Like Whitehead, Stuart concluded with a lament over the lack of video games coverage on television, criticising broadcasters for "ceding responsibility to YouTubers and specialist online documentary makers" and for "failing their audiences".  Sam Wollaston, also writing for The Guardian, gave a mixed review and was critical of the talking heads format. Wollaston commented that despite containing interesting ideas, the show was overly long.  For gamers however, Wollaston wrote that the show "would have been pretty much heaven".

References

External links
How Videogames Changed the World on Channel 4

2013 in British television
2013 television specials
Channel 4 original programming
Television series created by Charlie Brooker
Documentary television series about video games
Television series by Endemol
Television series by Zeppotron
Video gaming in the United Kingdom